The 2nd Canadian Folk Music Awards were held on December 10, 2006, at the Myer Horowitz Theatre in Edmonton, Alberta.

Nominees and recipients
Recipients are listed first and highlighted in boldface.

References

External links
Canadian Folk Music Awards

02
Canadian Folk Music Awards
Canadian Folk Music Awards
Canadian Folk Music Awards
Canadian Folk Music Awards